Gabaculine is a naturally occurring neurotoxin first isolated from the bacteria Streptomyces toyacaensis, which acts as a potent and irreversible GABA transaminase inhibitor, and also a GABA reuptake inhibitor. Gabaculine is also known as 3-amino-2,3-dihydrobenzoic acid hydrochloride  and 5-amino cyclohexa-1,3 dienyl carboxylic acid. Gabaculine increased GABA levels in the brain and had an effect on  convulsivity in mice.

Mechanism of action 
Gabaculine includes a comparable structure to GABA and a dihydrobenzene ring. This comparable GABA structure is used in order to be able to take the place of GABA during the first steps of transamination, including transaldimination and 1,3-prototrophic shift to the pyridoxamine imine. Following this, a proton from the dihydrobenzene ring is abstracted by an enzymatic base, thus causing the ring to become aromatic. The aromatic stabilization energy of the aromatic ring is what causes this reaction to be irreversible, thus causing the complex not to react further.

Preclinical studies
Animal studies to determine the effect of gabaculine on GABA levels in the brain were heavily conducted around the 1970s. These in vivo studies involved mostly the use of mice that underwent intravenous administration of this drug. Each of these studies concluded that gabaculine has a great potential to increase the GABA levels in the brain of these mice in a time dependent manner.  
Along with determining the effect of GABA levels, in vivo studies were conducted to investigate the ability of gabaculine to inhibit convulsions in mice. Results indicated that gabaculine provided a clear anticonvulsant effect against seizures induced by high doses of chemoconvulsants or electroshock.
The toxicity of this compound was also investigated using animal mouse models. Because of this potential lethal effect, gabaculine was proved to be too toxic for use as a drug however, it can still be used as a compound to alter GABA levels in studies of experimental epilepsy.

Regulation
Gabaculine has not been approved by the FDA as a pharmaceutical entity; however, it can be used as a chemical compound for research purposes only. This compound is not considered a hazardous substance according to OSHA 29 CFR 1910.1200.

References

Neurotoxins
GABA transaminase inhibitors
GABA reuptake inhibitors
Amines
Carboxylic acids
GABA analogues